Street Angels (少女党) is a 1999 Singaporean drama film directed by David Lam Tak-luk.

Cast and roles
 Grace Yip		
 Melody Chen		
 Nicholas Tse

References

External links
 IMDb entry

1999 films
1999 drama films
Films directed by David Lam
Singaporean drama films